Windermere Hotel may refer to:

Windermere Hotel (London)
Hotel Windermere (Chicago)
Windermere Hotel (Lake District), a hotel in Windermere, Cumbria, England